This is a list of notable performances of third party and independent candidates in elections to the United States House of Representatives. It is rare for candidates, other than those of the six parties which have succeeded as major parties (Federalist Party, Democratic-Republican Party, National Republican Party, Democratic Party, Whig Party, Republican Party), to take large shares of the vote in elections.

Listed below are sets of House elections in which a third party or independent candidate won at least 5.0% of the vote. Winners are shown in bold. In some of the listed cases a faction or factions of a state's major party ran against each other, often making it difficult to ascertain which was the mainline candidate and which was the bolter; in such cases, those candidates which are not listed on a standard major party line are still listed, but are not considered traditional third party victories as often these candidates sat in Congress as affiliated party members (barring cases like Joe Lieberman who, upon winning re-election in 2006 as a third party candidate, sat as an Independent Democrat).

1828–1829

1850–1851

1852–1853

1854–1855

1856–1857

1858–1859

1878

1894

1896

1898

1908–1909

1916

1920–1921

1928–1929

1930

1936

1938

1940

1968

1970

1974

1984

2002

2006

2008

2010

2012

2014

2016

2018

2020

2022

Notes 

United States House of Representatives elections
Lists of elections in the United States
Third party (United States)